Cyprus competed at the 2022 Mediterranean Games held in Oran, Algeria from 25 June to 6 July 2022.

Medalists

| width="78%" align="left" valign="top" |

Archery

Cyprus competed in archery.

Artistic gymnastics

Marios Georgiou won the bronze medal in the men's artistic individual all-around event. He also won the gold medal in the men's horizontal bar event.

Athletics

Cyprus won six medals in athletics.

Badminton

Cyprus won one bronze medal in badminton.

Boxing

Cyprus competed in boxing.

Judo

Cyprus competed in judo.

Karate

Cyprus won one medal in karate.

Shooting

Cyprus won one gold medal in shooting.

Swimming

Cyprus won two medals in swimming.

Men

Women

Taekwondo

Cyprus competed in Taekwondo.

 Legend
 PTG — Won by Points Gap
 SUP — Won by superiority
 OT — Won on over time (Golden Point)
 DQ — Won by disqualification
 PUN — Won by punitive declaration
 WD — Won by withdrawal

Men

Women

Tennis

Cyprus competed in tennis.

Weightlifting

Cyprus competed in weightlifting.

Men

Wrestling

Cyprus won one medal in wrestling.

Men's freestyle wrestling

References

Nations at the 2022 Mediterranean Games
2022
Mediterranean Games